DYMX (95.5 FM), broadcasting as 95.5 Star FM, is a radio station owned and operated by Bombo Radyo Philippines through its licensee People's Broadcasting Service, Inc. Its studio, offices and transmitter are located at the CBS Bldg., 140 M. Velez St., Guadalupe, Cebu City.

History
Star FM started operations on May 25, 1994, a month after Bombo Radyo was rebranded all 17 FM stations under the such branding. Its initially carried a power of 25,000 watts, covering the Central Visayas region and portions of the Western and Eastern Visayas. In less than a year, Star FM was ranked by the Radio Research Council as the #1 FM radio station in Metro Cebu. It remained on top until 1999, when its rival station 91.5 Hot FM (now Yes The Best) took over the top spot, which lasted until 2002.

Star FM became the first FM radio station in Metro Cebu to use audio cassette tapes and compact discs for playing their favorite songs and playback. Among its notable programs were It's All For You every Morning, Afternoon & Evening, Twilight Zone, Star Sweep every weekday, Never on Sunday, Superstar Sunday and Sunday Disco Recall every Sunday.

In April 2006, on its 12th anniversary, Star FM was relaunched with a new logo and the slogan, "Iba Ang Dating". A Few years later, the station reduced its power to 10,000 watts.

In 2013, Star FM adapted the new slogan "Like Mo, Share Mo". On February 3, 2014, Bombo Network News began simulcasting in several Star FM stations alongside Bombo Radyo stations; thus allowing the station to added news and talk to its format. The network's flagship national newscast was made to compete with longer-established rival Brigada News FM National, a news and music FM station owned by Brigada Mass Media Corporation.

On the 1st quarter of 2016, Star FM's provincial stations started carrying the slogan "It's All For You", this time emphasizing more on the music. In a few months, it began broadcast 24/7 operations until 2018. From September 2016 to January 2018, Star FM operated with a transmitting power of 5,000 watts stereo, but with limited coverage area.

On January 18, 2018, after setting up its new transmitting equipment at the rooftop of the CBS Building, Star FM upgraded its power to a newly improved 25,000 watts stereo, resulting in an even clearer signal in Central Visayas and Southern Leyte. It was only in the same year when several Star FM stations licensed to Consolidated Broadcasting System transferred its licensee to People's Broadcasting Service, following the former's non-renewal of licensee. In 2019, due to financial problems, Star FM reduced its daily broadcast schedule from 24 hours to 19 hours, signing off at 11:00 PM.

In March 2020, The Holy Rosary started simulcasting on all Bombo Radyo and Star FM stations nationwide, following the extension of the community quarantine regulations amidst the COVID-19 in the Philippines. The station also reduced its broadcasting hours, signing off between 9:00-9:30pm.

Following the aftermath of Typhoon Rai (Odette) at the evening of December 16, 2021, Star FM was simulcast over its sister station Bombo Radyo in providing updates regarding the impact of the said typhoon in Cebu, Bohol and Leyte. A day later, DYMF went off the air after its transmitter was destroyed by the said typhoon. Since then, several of its programs began airing on Star FM, this time under the interim name Bombo Radyo Star FM. On February 15, 2022, Star FM reverted to its original programming after DYMF, whose new transmitter equipment was installed the day before, resumed operations.

References

DYMX
Radio stations established in 1994
Bombo Radyo Philippines